Deerfield River is a river that runs for  from southern Vermont through northwestern Massachusetts to the Connecticut River. The Deerfield River was historically influential in the settlement of western Franklin County, Massachusetts, and its namesake town. It is the Connecticut River's second-longest tributary in Massachusetts,  shorter than Metropolitan Springfield's Westfield River.

The river's confluence with the Connecticut is in Greenfield, Massachusetts, downstream of Turners Falls. The Deerfield is one of the most heavily dammed rivers in the country with, on average, a dam almost every  for its entire length. In Shelburne Falls, the glacial potholes and the Bridge of Flowers are popular tourist attractions around the river.

Geography
The great descent of the river of nearly 1,100 feet over 50 miles furnished water power at many places. Several streams nearly as large as the main river enter the Deerfield River from the north. Among its tributaries is the Green River.

Dams
There are 10 dams on the Deerfield, owned by three different electric utilities:
 Great River Hydro LLC purchased from the TransCanada Corporation in 2017 the Somerset, Searsburg, Harriman, Sherman, Deerfield #2, #3, #4 and #5 hydroelectric generating stations and dams;
 Brookfield Power owns the Bear Swamp Pump Storage project and Fife Brook dam;
 Nautilus Power LLC of Charlotte, North Carolina, owns the relatively small Gardner Falls Dam, which dates from 1904.

The various hydroelectric facilities were purchased from National Energy & Gas Transmission, Inc. (NEGT) subsidiary USGen New England, Inc. at the conclusion of NEGT's Chapter 11 bankruptcy and liquidation of the assets of the USGen subsidiary in 2005.

In 1994, an agreement on relicensing the various dams with the Federal Energy Regulatory Commission (FERC) and the Massachusetts and Vermont state authorities that regulate water quality led to comprehensive coordinated water release and power generation schedules to enable more recreational use of the river, with minimum water flow measures to mitigate the dam impact on riverine  habitat.

A  dam was proposed for the Stillwater section of the river in Deerfield in the mid to late twentieth century. Local opposition helped to defeat the proposal.

History

The hydroelectric development of the Deerfield River began in 1910 when the New England Power Company was formed to acquire water rights on the Deerfield and construct dams. The largest dam, Harriman, was built in the early 1920s and has an unusual overflow structure known as the "Glory Hole." This structure is a funnel-like concrete tube that leads to a tunnel under the earthen dam and prevents high flows from overtopping the dam.

The last dam built on the Deerfield was Fife Brook Dam, which was built in the early 1970s in conjunction with the development of the Bear Swamp Pumped Storage facility. This facility acts as a battery for power generated during times of low demand. By using excess electricity to pump water to the top of the mountain, where a reservoir was created by building levees around an existing high swamp, energy is stored. When electrical demand is higher (usually midday or afternoon/evening) the water from the upper reservoir can be released through the turbines (which act as pumps in reverse) to meet demand.

The third commercial nuclear reactor in the United States was built in the town of Rowe, Massachusetts, on the banks of the Deerfield River by Sherman Reservoir. Known as "Yankee Rowe", it generated electricity for New England from 1960 to 1992.

The eastern entrance of the Hoosac Tunnel is located on the river in the town of Florida, Massachusetts. It is a railroad tunnel, still in use, started in 1851 and completed in 1875. The Burleigh Rock Drill, one of the first pneumatic drills, was used in its construction. Construction also featured the first large-scale commercial use of nitroglycerine and electric blasting caps. The American Society of Civil Engineers made the tunnel a Historic Civil Engineering Landmark in 1975.

The Bardwell's Ferry Bridge is a  pin-connected through truss, built in 1882 and spanning the Deerfield River between the towns of Shelburne and Conway in Franklin County. It is the longest single-span lenticular bridge in Massachusetts. It has been listed on the National Register of Historic Places.

Recreation

Activities on and around the Deerfield include whitewater kayaking, canoeing, tubing, fishing, swimming, and camping. A popular swimming area by the Stillwater Bridge in Deerfield has waterside cliffs up to forty feet high that swimmers jump from; this activity is tolerated but not condoned. There are two sections of the river for whitewater paddling: the Fife Brook section
for class II and III paddlers, and the "Dryway" for class IV paddlers.

There are several tributaries of the Deerfield River that provide excellent whitewater creek runs, including the class IV-V West Branch of the Deerfield in Readsboro, Vermont, the class V Dunbar Brook in Monroe, Massachusetts, the class V Pelham Brook in Rowe, Massachusetts, the class IV Cold River in Florida and Charlemont, Massachusetts, and the class III Chickley River in Hawley, Massachusetts.

This is also an excellent trout fishery, great for fly fishing. Two sections between the Fife Brook dam and the Route 2 bridge are catch and release. There are 5 dams which control the majority of the river flow and allow selectable trout fishing through the year.

See also
Connecticut River
Pioneer Valley
Franklin County, Massachusetts
List of old growth forests in Massachusetts
List of rivers of Vermont

References

Further reading
 , retrieved 15 June 2005
    Catherine Reid,  Historic Deerfield (Spring 2003)

External links

 Deerfield River Watershed Association
 Deerfield River Hydroelectric System National Energy & Gas Transmission
 Lozer Cup  Downriver race series held annually during the Monroe Bridge section release season

Rivers of Franklin County, Massachusetts
Rivers of Vermont
Tributaries of the Connecticut River
Rivers of Massachusetts
Rivers of Windham County, Vermont
Rivers of Bennington County, Vermont